FSV Braunfels is a German association football club established in 1918 in Braunfels, Hesse.

History
To date the club's greatest successes have been promotions to the Oberliga Hessen (IV) for single season turns in 1999–2000 and 2003–04. After a second-place finish in the Landesliga Hessen-Mitte in 2006 and success in the subsequent promotion rounds, the club again returned to the Oberliga for a season, being imideateley relegated again. It made another return to the Hessenliga in 2012 but was once more relegated after only one year.

FSV currently has a membership of 600.

Honours
The club's honours:
 Landesliga Hessen-Mitte
 Champions: 2003
 Runners-up: 1999, 2006
 Verbandsliga Hessen-Mitte
 Champions: 2012

Recent seasons
The recent season-by-season performance of the club:

 With the introduction of the Regionalligas in 1994 and the 3. Liga in 2008 as the new third tier, below the 2. Bundesliga, all leagues below dropped one tier. Also in 2008, a large number of football leagues in Hesse were renamed, with the Oberliga Hessen becoming the Hessenliga, the Landesliga becoming the Verbandsliga, the Bezirksoberliga becoming the Gruppenliga and the Bezirksliga becoming the Kreisoberliga.

Stadium
Braunfels plays its home matches at the Stadion Schloßblick which has a capacity of 5,000 (~500 seats).

References

External links
 Official team site
 Das deutsche Fußball-Archiv  historical German domestic league tables

Football clubs in Germany
Football clubs in Hesse
Association football clubs established in 1918
1918 establishments in Germany